Gardenia Park is a 90% white suburb of the city of Bloemfontein in South Africa.

References

Suburbs of Bloemfontein